Söğüt is a district of Bilecik Province, Turkey.

Söğüt (literally "willow" in Turkish) may also refer to:

 Söğüt, Burdur, a town in Çavdır district of Burdur Province, Turkey
 Söğüt, Çardak
 Söğüt Dam, a dam in Kütahya Province, Turkey

See also 
Söğütlü, a district of Sakarya Province, Turkey
Söğütlüçeşme, a railway station in Istanbul, Turkey